A Little Bit of Heaven may refer to:

 A Little Bit of Heaven (1940 film), a 1940 musical film
 A Little Bit of Heaven (2011 film), a 2011 romantic comedy
 "A Little Bit of Heaven", a parlour song by Ernest Ball recorded by John McCormack and George MacFarlane
 "A Little Bit of Heaven" (Ronnie Dove song), a 1965 hit song by pop singer Ronnie Dove
 "Little Bit of Heaven", a 1993 song by Lisa Stansfield